Heroes Shed No Tears (released in the Philippines as Return to Killing Fields) is a 1986 Hong Kong war film directed by John Woo, produced by Peter Chan, and starring Eddy Ko. Filmed prior to the success of Woo's A Better Tomorrow, the film is a story about a group of mercenaries on a mission to extract a drug lord from the Indochina area.

Plot
The Thai government hires a group of Chinese mercenaries led by Chan Chung to capture a powerful drug lord from the Golden Triangle Area near the Vietnamese border with Laos. The mercenaries manage to capture the drug lord, but his men are trying to set him free. Along the way the heroes cross into Vietnam and must face a sadistic Vietnamese colonel as well as protect the family of Chang Chung which lives in a village near the border.

Cast
Eddy Ko as Chan Chung
Lam Ching-ying as Vietnamese colonel         
Ma Ying-Chun as Kenny
Philippe Loffredo as Louis
Cécile Le Bailly as a French girl
Lee Hoi-Suk as Julie
Chin Yuet-Sang as Chin

Production
After finishing Plain Jane to the Rescue director John Woo began working on a film titled The Sunset Warrior. Woo was not happy working for the production company Golden Harvest, noting that he "I just wanted to make any movie for them to finish the contract." Woo found the script to be fairly simple and made changes to it to make it more emotional.

The film was shot in Thailand the film featured cast and crew who did not speak English. This included three Korean actors, two French actors (Phillippe Loffredo and Cécile Le Bailly) and a Japanese cameraman and director of photography. The film included scenes of sexuality and drug use which were not shot by Woo.

Release
After the film's completion, it was shelved. Woo commented that the film was all over the place in tone with sometimes being very emotional, something being as violent as a horror film and that it did not contain any popular actors. As of 2004, Woo stated he had not seen the film in its finished form.

After the popularity of Woo's film A Better Tomorrow, the film was released for one week in Hong Kong under the new title Heroes Shed No Tears. The film was released in Hong Kong on September 5, 1986. It grossed a total of 2.8 million Hong Kong Dollars. In the Philippines, the film was released by Pioneer Releasing as Return to Killing Fields on January 28, 1988, connecting it to the unrelated biographical drama film The Killing Fields despite the latter being set in Cambodia.

Reception
From retrospective reviews, Heroes Shed No Tears received a four out of ten rating from John Charles in his book The Hong Kong Filmography , 1977-1997. The review noted that the film had "virtually no plot" and "few sympathetic characters" and that it "displays none of the finesse that would characterise Woo's later work" In his book Ten Thousand Bullets, Christopher Heard stated that the film was "nowhere near as slick as [Woo]'s later movies, but it does have a dark visual harshness that indicates Woo knew the direction in which he wanted to travel."

See also
List of Hong Kong films

References

Footnotes

Sources

External links

1986 films
1986 action thriller films
1980s Cantonese-language films
1980s Hong Kong films
Films directed by John Woo
Films shot in Thailand
Golden Harvest films
Hong Kong action thriller films
War adventure films